Silvia Clemente Municio (born 6 September 1967) is a Spanish politician and civil servant. She is a member of the People's Party of Castile and León, and was the minister for the environment of the Junta of Castile and León from 2001 to 2003. She was appointed director general in charge of environmental quality on August 5, 1999. She was president of the Junta of Castile and León, from 2015 to 2019. She changed her obligation when she was appointed culture and tourism advisor in 2003. She was exercises the obligation of advisor to agriculture and livestock between 2007 and 2015. She announced her resignation as a member of the People's Party.

Biography
Silvia Clemente was born in La Velilla, Spain. She ‍was acquired his law degree from University of Madrid. She began her activity in the territorial service for agriculture and livestock in Segovia. She changed her obligation in 2003, when she was appointed culture and tourism advisor. She was appointed environment counselor. She was ‍also attorney in the courts of Junta of Castile and León for Segovia.

References 

1967 births
Living people
20th-century Spanish women politicians
21st-century Spanish women politicians 
People's Party (Spain) politicians
Presidents of the Cortes of Castile and León

Links
 cyltv.es - Silvia Clemente, Tierry Servant y Louis Harvaux, cofrades de honor de la Ribera del Duero